Chen Mingyi (born August 1940) is a politician in the People's Republic of China. Chen was born in Fuzhou, Fujian Province. He joined the Chinese Communist Party in 1960. He graduated from the Department of Naval Architecture at Shanghai Jiaotong University, obtaining a master's degree.

After 1985, he became a member of standing committee of CCP's Fujian committee, vice secretary of CCP's Fujian committee and director of department of organization. From January to September 1993, he was the vice governor of Fujian Province. From April 1994 to October 1996, he was the Governor of Fujian province and the vice secretary of CCP's Fujian committee. From October 1996 to December 2000, he was the secretary of CCP's Fujian committee.
After 2001, he became the chairman of Fujian political consultative conference. 

He was an alternate member of CCP 12th, 13th and 14th central committee, and a member of CCP 15th central committee.

References

External links
Chen Mingyi's profile at xinhuanet.com

|-

1940 births
Living people
Shanghai Jiao Tong University alumni
Politicians from Fuzhou
Governors of Fujian
Chinese Communist Party politicians from Fujian
People's Republic of China politicians from Fujian
Alternate members of the 12th Central Committee of the Chinese Communist Party
Alternate members of the 13th Central Committee of the Chinese Communist Party
Alternate members of the 14th Central Committee of the Chinese Communist Party
Members of the 15th Central Committee of the Chinese Communist Party
Delegates to the 8th National People's Congress
Delegates to the 9th National People's Congress
Delegates to the National People's Congress from Fujian
Members of the 9th Chinese People's Political Consultative Conference
Members of the 10th Chinese People's Political Consultative Conference
Members of the Standing Committee of the 11th Chinese People's Political Consultative Conference